Rear Admiral Anthony Kingsmil Rimington is a senior Royal Navy officer. He is currently serves as Assistant Chief of the Naval Staff (Policy).

Naval career
Educated at Sherborne School and Durham University, Rimington joined the Royal Navy in September 1991. He trained as a naval pilot and then took part in the evacuation of personnel from Beirut in 2006. He became commanding officer of 702 Naval Air Squadron in 2012, planning team lead at UK Maritime Component Command in 2014 and Deputy Assistant Chief of Staff Navy Commitments in 2015. After that he became Chief of Staff to the Carrier Enabled Power Projection ('CEPP') team in 2016 and station commander of RNAS Culdrose (HMS Seahawk) in 2018. He was appointed Principal Staff Officer to the Chief of the Defence Staff in 2020 and, with promotion to rear admiral, he became Assistant Chief of the Naval Staff (Policy) in 2022.

References

Living people
Royal Navy rear admirals
Year of birth missing (living people)
People educated at Sherborne School
Alumni of Durham University